SMDR may refer to:
Simple Metadata Registry, a way of describing metadata
Station Messaging Detail Record, a way to record telecommunications system activity, also known as Call detail record or CDR
Prince Rogers Nelson song title, SMDR is an abbreviation for "Sex, Music, Drugs, Romance".